The Fort Hamilton Parkway station is a local station on the BMT West End Line of the New York City Subway, located in Brooklyn at the intersection of Fort Hamilton Parkway and New Utrecht Avenue, in the neighborhood of Borough Park. It is served by the D train at all times. The station opened in 1916, and had its platforms extended in the 1960s.

History
Fort Hamilton Parkway station opened on June 24, 1916, along with the first portion of the BMT West End Line from 36th Street on the BMT Fourth Avenue Line to 18th Avenue station. The line was originally a surface excursion railway to Coney Island, called the Brooklyn, Bath and Coney Island Railroad, which was established in 1862, but did not reach Coney Island until 1864. Under the Dual Contracts of 1913, an elevated line was built over New Utrecht Avenue, 86th Street and Stillwell Avenue.

Station layout

This elevated station has three tracks and two slightly offset side platforms. The D train stops here at all times, and the center express track is not normally used in service. Both platforms have cream-colored windscreens and red canopies, both supported by green frames and columns, for most of their centers. Their ends have steel waist-high fencing.

The station's artwork, installed during a 2012 renovation, is called Gardens of Fort Hamilton Parkway Station by Portia Munson. It consists of stained glass murals on the platform windscreens depicting various plants.

Exits
This station has two station houses beneath the platforms and tracks. The full-time one is at the south end. It has two staircases to each platform, a waiting area/crossunder, turnstile bank, token booth, and staircases going down to either northern corners of New Utrecht Avenue and 45th Street. The northern station house is abandoned. A single staircase from each platform goes down to a walkway on either side of the building, where a turnstile provides access to and from the station. Two staircases go down to either side of New Utrecht Avenue between 44th and 43rd Streets.

References

External links 

 
 Station Reporter — D Train
 The Subway Nut — Fort Hamilton Parkway Pictures
 45th Street entrance from Google Maps Street View
 44th Street entrance from Google Maps Street View
 Platforms from Google Maps Street View

BMT West End Line stations
New York City Subway stations in Brooklyn
Railway stations in the United States opened in 1916
1916 establishments in New York City
Borough Park, Brooklyn